Keith Newman (born 20 November 1949) is an English former professional footballer who played as a half-back in the Football League for Aldershot and York City, and in non-League football for Hungerford Town. He was capped by England schools.

References

1949 births
Living people
People from Farnham
English footballers
England schools international footballers
Association football midfielders
Aldershot F.C. players
York City F.C. players
Hungerford Town F.C. players
English Football League players